Minimalist composers include:
Hans Abrahamsen (born in Denmark)
John Adams (born in the US)
Laurie Anderson (born in the US) 
Louis Andriessen (born in the Netherlands)
William Basinski (born in the US)
David Behrman (born in Austria)
Barbara Benary (born and died in the US)
David Borden (born in the US; and his ensemble Mother Mallard's Portable Masterpiece Company)
Anne Boyd (born in Australia) 
Gavin Bryars (born in the UK)
Joseph Byrd (born in the US)
John Cage (US, 1912–1992)
Jung Hee Choi (born in South Korea) 
Anna Clyne (born in the UK) 
Tony Conrad (born in the US)
Julius Eastman (born and died in the US)
Ludovico Einaudi (born in Italy)
Brian Eno (born in the UK)
Roger Eno (born in the UK)
Renaud Gagneux (born in France)
Frans Geysen (born in Belgium)
Jon Gibson (born in the US)
John Godfrey (composer) (born in the UK)
Karel Goeyvaerts (born and died in Belgium)
Annie Gosfield (born in the US) 
Michael Harrison (born in the US)
Christopher Hobbs (born in the UK)
Simeon ten Holt (born and died in the Netherlands)
Terry Jennings (born and died in the US)
Scott Johnson (born in the US)
Sarah Kirkland Snider (born in the US) 
Catherine Lamb (born in the US) 
Hannah Lash (born in the US) 
Douglas Leedy (born in the US)
Angus MacLise (born in the US, died in Nepal)
Richard Maxfield (born and died in the US)
Anna Meredith (born in the UK) 
Meredith Monk (born in the US) 
Robert Moran (born in the US)
Phill Niblock (born in the US)
Michael Nyman (born in the UK)
Mike Oldfield (born in the UK)
Pauline Oliveros (born in the US)
Charlemagne Palestine (born in the US)
Michael Parsons (born in the UK)
Alexandre Rabinovitch-Barakovsky (born in Russia)
Éliane Radigue (born in France)
Steve Reich (born in the US)
Terry Riley (born in the US)
Arthur Russell (born and died in the US)
Caroline Shaw (born in the US) 
Howard Skempton (born in the UK)
Dave Smith (born in the UK)
Ann Southam (born and died in Canada)
Tibor Szemző (born in Hungary)
James Tenney (born in the US)
Yann Tiersen (born in France)
Michael Torke (born in the US)
Lois V. Vierk (born in the US) 
Wolfgang Voigt (born in Germany)
Yoshi Wada (born in Japan)
Michael Waller (born in US)
Shelley Washington (born in the US) 
John White (born in the UK)
Julia Wolfe (born in the US) 
La Monte Young (born in the US)
Ralph Zurmühle (born in Switzerland)

Other minimalists include:
Australia
Andrew Chubb
Robert Davidson
Nigel Westlake
Belgium
Wim Mertens
Canada
Peter Hannan
Kyle Bobby Dunn (based in the United States)
Estonia
Arvo Pärt
Finland
Petri Kuljuntausta
Erkki Salmenhaara
France
Patrick Dorobisz
Renaud Gagneux
Yann Tiersen
Georgia
Giya Kancheli
Germany
Peter Michael Hamel
Hauke Harder
Hans Otte
Ernstalbrecht Stiebler
Walter Zimmermann
Hungary
Zoltán Jeney
László Melis
László Sáry
László Vidovszky
Italy
Fulvio Caldini
Roberto Carnevale
Lucio Garau
Giovanni Sollima
Ludovico Einaudi
Japan
Joe Hisaishi
Jo Kondo
Yoshi Wada (based in the United States)
Yasunori Mitsuda (freelance game music composer, most noted for his works in the Chrono series)
Latvia
Peteris Vasks
Netherlands
Douwe Eisenga
Poland
Zygmunt Krauze
Tomasz Sikorski
Russia
Vladimir Martynov
Anton Batagov
Kirill Richter
Serbia
Vladimir Tošić
South Africa
Kevin Volans
Spain
Ukraine
Lubomyr Melnyk
United Kingdom
Joe Cutler
Graham Fitkin
Malcolm Galloway
Orlando Gough
Rob Haigh
Max Richter
Steve Martland
Andrew Poppy
Simon Rackham
United States
John Luther Adams
Glenn Branca
Harold Budd
Lawrence Chandler
Richard Chartier
Rhys Chatham (based in France)
Philip Corner (based in Italy)
Kurt Doles
Arnold Dreyblatt (based in Germany)
Daniel Goode
Rafael Anton Irisarri
Tom Johnson (based in France)
Ingram Marshall
Meredith Monk
Tim Risher
Andrew Shapiro
Wayne Siegel (based in Denmark)
David Toub
Michael Waller (born in US)
Stars of the Lid (Adam Wiltzie & Brian McBride)

 Nicaragua
 José Antonio Rivera

Mystic minimalists

A number of composers showing a distinctly religious influence have been labelled the "mystic minimalists", or "holy minimalists":
Henryk Górecki
Alan Hovhaness (the earliest mystic minimalist)
Giya Kancheli
Hans Otte
Arvo Pärt
John Tavener
Pēteris Vasks

Precedent composers

Other composers whose works have been described as precedents to minimalism include:
Jakob van Domselaer, whose early-20th century experiments in translating the theories of Piet Mondrian's De Stijl movement into music represent an early precedent to minimalist music.
Alexander Mosolov, whose orchestral composition Iron Foundry (1923) is made up of mechanical and repetitive patterns
George Antheil, whose 1924 Ballet Mecanique is characterized by much use of motoric and repetitive patterns, as well as an instrumentation made up of multiple player pianos and mallet percussion
Erik Satie, seen as a precursor of minimalism as in much of his music, for example his score for Francis Picabia's 1924 film Entr'acte which consists of phrases, many borrowed from bawdy popular songs, ordered seemingly arbitrarily and repetitiously, providing a rhythmic counterpoint to the film.
Colin McPhee, whose Tabuh-Tabuhan for two pianos and orchestra (1936) features the use of motoric, repetitive, pentatonic patterns drawn from the music of Bali (and featuring a large section of tuned percussion)
Carl Orff, who, particularly in his later theater works Antigonae (1940–49) and Oedipus der Tyrann (1957–58), utilized instrumentations (six pianos and multiple xylophones, in imitation of gamelan music) and musical patterns (motoric, repetitive, triadic) reminiscent of the later music of Steve Reich and Philip Glass
Yves Klein, whose 1949 Monotone Symphony (formally The Monotone-Silence Symphony, conceived 1947–1948) is an orchestral 40-minute piece whose first movement is an unvarying 20-minute drone and the second and last movement a 20-minute silence, predating by several years both the drone music works of La Monte Young and the "silent" 4'33" of John Cage.
Morton Feldman, whose works prominently feature some sort of repetition as well as a sparseness
Alvin Lucier, whose acoustical experiments demand a stripped-down musical surface to bring out details in the phenomena
Anton Webern, whose economy of materials and sparse textures led many of the minimalists who were educated in serialism to turn to a reduction of means.
Alphonse Allais is the author of the earliest known example of a completely silent musical composition. His Funeral March for the Obsequies of a Great Deaf Man of 1897 consists of twenty-four blank measures. The fact that this is his one and only composition makes him all the more a precursor of minimalism in music.

References

 
Lists of composers